FC Kuressaare, commonly known as Kuressaare, is a professional football club, based in Kuressaare, Saaremaa island, Estonia. The club's home ground is Kuressaare linnastaadion.

Founded on 14 March 1997, the club competes in the Meistriliiga, the top tier of Estonian football.

History

Early history 
Kuressaare was founded on 14 March 1997. Its predecessor was a youth club B.B. Sport, coached by Johannes Kaju. Kuressaare joined the Estonian football league system and began competing in the Western division of the III liiga. The club's first president and manager was Aivar Pohlak.

Kuressaare was promoted to the Esiliiga for the 1998 season and finished in 6th place under the new manager Jan Važinski. Most of the team were Saaremaa locals who were reinforced by players from Kuressaare's parent club Flora. Kuressaare won the Esiliiga in the 1999 season and was promoted to the Meistriliiga.

Kuressaare finished the 2000 season, its maiden season in the Estonian top-flight, in 7th place. The club finished the 2001 season in 10th place under new manager Zaur Tšilingarašvili and was relegated to the Esiliiga.

In 2002, Sergei Zamogilnõi was hired as manager. Kuressaare finished the 2002 season as runners-up, qualifying to the promotion play-offs. Kuressaare won the play-offs against Lootus and returned to the Mesitriliiga. Kuressaare's stay in the top-flight was cut short again as the club finished the 2003 season in 8th place and was relegated. The team was restructured in 2004, using players from reserve team Sörve and was promoted back to the Meistriliiga despite finishing in 5th place due to the expansion of the league.

The 2005 season was the most successful in the club's earlier history, winning 7 and drawing 6 matches out of 36. The 8–1 victory over Dünamo became the new club record. Despite that, the team finished 8th and was relegated after losing the relegation play-offs against Ajax.

Kuressaare earned its way back to the Meistriliiga in the 2006 season, but was once again relegated in the following Meistriliiga season. The team finished the 2008 season as runners-up and was promoted to the Meistriliiga. Kuressaare remained in the Meistriliiga for the next five seasons from 2009 to 2013, when the club was relegated to Esiliiga after finishing the season in 10th place. After the 2015 season, Kuressaare were relegated to Esiliiga B, which they won the following season.

Return to top-flight football 

After finishing 5th in the Estonian second tier Esiliiga during the 2017 season, FC Kuressaare were unexpectedly offered the chance to return to Meistriliiga, due to FC Infonet and Sillamäe Kalev leaving top-flight football and Maardu Linnameeskond and Rakvere Tarvas, who both finished in front of Kuressaare in the 2017 Esiliiga season, opting to not fill the vacant Meistriliiga spots. Jan Važinski returned to the manager role and Kuressaare finished the 2018 Meistriliiga season in ninth place, beating FC Elva in the relegation play-offs to maintain their spot in Estonian top-flight football. The following 2019 season concluded in a similar way, with Kuressaare finishing in ninth place and this time beating Pärnu Vaprus in the play-offs.

With the introduction of solidarity mechanisms in 2020, Marco Lukka became the first ever fully proffesional football player of the club. Kuressaare also appointed Roman Kozhukhovskyi as the manager. Again, Kuressaare finished the season in 9th place and won the relegation play-offs against Maardu. The 2021 season proved to be successful for the club, as they finished in seventh place. Otto-Robert Lipp's goal against FC Flora in their 2–2 draw also won the Meistriliiga's 'goal of the season' award.

The 2022 season was the most successful in FC Kuressaare's history, as the club finished 5th and accumulated 50 points in 36 matches.

Players

First-team squad

For season transfers, see transfers summer 2022 and transfers winter 2022–23.

Out on loan

Reserves and academy

Personnel

Current technical staff

Managerial history

Honours

League
 Esiliiga
 Winners (1): 1999
 Esiliiga B
 Winners (1): 2016

Kit manufacturers and shirt sponsors

Seasons and statistics

References

External links

  
 FC Kuressaare at Estonian Football Association

 
1997 establishments in Estonia
Association football clubs established in 1997
Kuressaare
Kuressaare